TBH may refer to:
 Talento Bilingüe de Houston ("Bilingual Theater of Houston")
 Tharawal language, ISO 639-3 language code
 "To Be Honest", see List of acronyms and initialisms: T
 .TBH files
 tbh (app), an anonymous social media app

Transport
 Tugdan Airport, IATA airport code
 Trinity Air Bahamas, ICAO airport code
 Tatibahar railway station, Lakhimpur district, Assam, India